Mdluli is an African surname that may refer to
John Mdluli (born 1972), Swaziland football player 
Labotsibeni Mdluli (c.1859–1925), Queen Mother and Queen Regent of Swaziland 
Mlungisi Mdluli (born 1980), South African football midfielder 
Richard Mdluli (born 1958), head of Police Crime Intelligence in South Africa 
Siyabonga Mdluli (born 1986), Swaziland football player
K.O (rapper) (born Ntokozo Mdluli), South African rapper
Pat Mdluli (born 1989) a South African humanitarian